The 1997 Ondrej Nepela Memorial was the 5th edition of an annual senior-level international figure skating competition held in Bratislava, Slovakia. It took place between September 26 and 28, 1997. Skaters competed in four disciplines: men's singles, ladies' singles, pair skating, and ice dancing. The competition is named for 1972 Olympic gold medalist Ondrej Nepela.

Results

Men

Ladies

Pairs

Ice dancing

External links
 5th Ondrej Nepela Memorial

Ondrej Nepela Memorial, 1997
Ondrej Nepela Memorial
Ondrej Nepela Memorial, 1997